East Melbourne was an electoral district of the Legislative Assembly in the Australian state of Victoria from 1859 to 1927.

It was defined in the 1858 Electoral Act as: 
Initially the district was created with two members, this was reduced to one member from the Assembly elections of 1904.

Members for East Melbourne

  = by-election
  = resigned

Election results

References

Former electoral districts of Victoria (Australia)
1859 establishments in Australia
1927 disestablishments in Australia